Aleksandar Mitreski (born 5 August 1980) is a Macedonian former professional footballer who played as a centre-back.

Club career
Mitreski was born in Ohrid, Yugoslavia. His career began at SC Ittigen. At the age of 12 he moved to the junior team of BSC Young Boys. He eventually became a first team regular and in 2002 he earned a one million Swiss Francs transfer to Grasshopper Club Zürich, where he won the league title in 2003.  He then spent a couple of years in Germany playing for 1. FC Köln and 1. FC Nürnberg before returning to Switzerland where he currently plays for FC Sion.

His journey with Sion ended on 2 April 2010 when his contract was terminated by the Sion President for late night visits to a casino.  Sion gave Mitreski the chance to tell his side of the story but he lied about how many times he was at the casino so the Sion President decided to terminate his contract after another Sion player was already kicked off the team for being involved in match fixing.

Mitreski agreed to a contract with FC Aarau on 18 December 2010.  He signed until the end of the season of the Swiss Challenge League.

International career
He made his senior debut for Macedonia in a March 2002 friendly match against Bosnia and Herzegovina and has earned a total of 33 caps, scoring no goals. His final international was a September 2007 European Championship qualification match against Russia.

References

External links
Aleksandar Mitreski at MacedonianFootball.com
 

1980 births
Living people
Sportspeople from Ohrid
Swiss people of Macedonian descent
Macedonian emigrants to Switzerland
Macedonian footballers
Footballers from Bern
Association football central defenders
North Macedonia international footballers
BSC Young Boys players
Grasshopper Club Zürich players
1. FC Köln players
1. FC Nürnberg players
FC Sion players
FC Aarau players
Swiss Super League players
Swiss Challenge League players
2. Bundesliga players
Macedonian expatriate footballers
Expatriate footballers in Switzerland
Macedonian expatriate sportspeople in Switzerland
Expatriate footballers in Germany
Macedonian expatriate sportspeople in Germany